Qaraqosh is one of the most conservative dialects of Northeastern Neo-Aramaic, spoken by ethnic Assyrians in the city of Qaraqosh (Bakhdida) in Iraq. Qaraqosh dialect has some similarities with the Aramaic spoken in nearby Karamlesh. It is a peripheral dialect in the dialect continuum of Neo-Aramaic stretching from Turoyo to western  Iran.

References

Further reading

Christian Northeastern Neo-Aramaic dialects